Dovid Shlomo Novoseller, a descendant of Rabbis Levi Yitzchok of Berditchev (Kedushat Levi),  Samuel Eidels (Maharsha) and Yechezkel Landau , was born in Yarmolintsky on Aug. 19, 1877, and received semicha from Rabbi Moshe Noson HaLevi Rubinstein, Av Beth Din of Vinnitsa.

Novoseller acted as Av Beth Din of Felshtin from 1917 to 1928. During the horrific February 1919 pogrom, Novoseller's wife and two daughters were murdered and he was left for dead. After a miraculous recovery he remarried and in 1928 emigrated to Philadelphia where he became Av Beth Din and founded Cong. Bnai Yehoshua and a free hostel for the Jewish homeless. He also served as president of the Vaad HaRabonim of Philadelphia and vice president of the Union of Orthodox Rabbis.

Novoseller died in 1966.

References

Rosenstein, Neil. The Unbroken Chain. Lakewood, NJ: CIS, 1990. p. 293
Schneiderman, Harry, ed. and I.J. Carmin Karpman. Who's Who in World Jewry 1965: A Biographical Dictionary of Outstanding Jews. New York: McKay, 1965. p. 708
The Two Lives of Rabbi David Novoseller

1877 births
1966 deaths
American Hasidic rabbis
Rabbis from Philadelphia
20th-century American rabbis